Dolores del Socorro Rodríguez Sabido (born 4 April 1958) is a Mexican politician from the National Action Party. In 2009 she served as Deputy of the LX Legislature of the Mexican Congress representing Yucatán.

References

1958 births
Living people
Politicians from Yucatán (state)
People from Mérida, Yucatán
Women members of the Chamber of Deputies (Mexico)
National Action Party (Mexico) politicians
21st-century Mexican politicians
21st-century Mexican women politicians
Deputies of the LX Legislature of Mexico
Members of the Chamber of Deputies (Mexico) for Yucatán
Universidad Mesoamericana de San Agustín alumni